"Cold Sweat" is a song by Irish rock band Thin Lizzy, and is the fifth track on their final studio album Thunder and Lightning.  It was co-written by guitarist John Sykes and Phil Lynott, and became the biggest single from the album, entering the UK charts at No. 28 (peaking at No. 27), and peaking at No. 23 in Ireland.

The song is known for Sykes's guitar solo, which features a tapping playing style that was becoming popular at the time of the album's release, though also used at the time by players such as Eddie Van Halen and Randy Rhoads.

Recording and promotion
"Cold Sweat" was recorded as one of the last songs on the Thunder and Lightning album. Thin Lizzy had already written all the other material that was required, and by the time Sykes joined the band, it only remained to record the songs. He recalled, "Because I hadn't contributed anything at this stage I just let go with an outline of what was to become "Cold Sweat"; all of that was made up there and then in the studio."

Producer Chris Tsangarides was surprised that the song was chosen as a single: "It was a bit heavy, even for them." Thin Lizzy were asked to perform the song on the British TV show Top of the Pops, but were deselected after Lynott argued with a stage manager.

On 28 January 1983, the band performed the song on the British TV music show The Tube, along with "The Sun Goes Down" and "The Boys Are Back in Town".

Cover versions
 1990: Sodom (Better off Dead)
 1992: Re-Animator (That Was Then This Is Now)
 1994: Helloween (Perfect Gentleman)
 2001: Adam West (Hi-Balls Are Rolling!)
 2001: Dreadnaught (One Piece Missing)
 2007: Jorn (Unlocking the Past)
 2007: Dublin Death Patrol (DDP 4 Life)
 2010: Kalmah (Japanese bonus track on 12 Gauge)
 2010: The Sword (Cold Sweat/Maiden, Mother & Crone single)
 2013: Megadeth (Super Collider)

Personnel
Phil Lynott – bass guitar, lead vocals
Scott Gorham – lead guitar
John Sykes – lead guitar
Brian Downey – drums
Darren Wharton – keyboards

References

1983 songs
1983 singles
Thin Lizzy songs
Songs written by John Sykes
Songs written by Phil Lynott
Vertigo Records singles